Dore Lake is a northern hamlet located on the south shore of Doré Lake, which is one of the largest lakes in northern Saskatchewan. Its name is the French word for "walleye". Dore Lake boasts excellent hunting and fishing. The community is accessed by  Highway 924 and by Dore Lake Airport.

Demographics 

See also 
 List of communities in Northern Saskatchewan
 List of communities in Saskatchewan
 List of Indian reserves in Saskatchewan

References

Division No. 18, Saskatchewan
Northern hamlets in Saskatchewan